Iron(II) molybdate is an inorganic compound with the chemical formula FeMoO4.

Synthesis
Iron(II) molybdate is prepared by the reaction of iron(II) chloride or iron(II) sulfate and sodium molybdate.

Due to its very low aqueous solubility, iron(II) molybdate precipitates out as a brown powder from the above reactions, which can then be obtained by filtration.

Applications 
FeMoO4 has been used as relatively stable active material for anodes in Li-ion batteries for conversion reaction, as anode material in aqueous supercapacitors due to fast redox reactions and as catalyst for oxygen evolution in alkaline solutions.

Safety
Iron(II) molybdate is toxic and may cause irritation. It should not be released into the environment. Inhalation of dusts should be avoided.

References

Iron(II) compounds
Molybdates